The following municipalities in Japan gained city status alone.

Which means that the current cities became cities without merging with another municipality.

1991 
 Sodegaura, Chiba
 Tsurugashima, Saitama
 Hidaka, Saitama
 Hannan, Osaka
 Kashiba, Nara
 Hamura, Tokyo

1992 
 Yachimata, Chiba
 Maebaru, Fukuoka

1994 
 Nisshin, Aichi

1996 
 Yoshikawa, Saitama
 Inzai, Chiba
 Kitahiroshima, Hokkaidō
 Ishikari, Hokkaidō

1997 
 Kyōtanabe, Kyoto
 Koga, Fukuoka

2001 
 Shiroi, Chiba
 Rittō, Shiga

2002 
 Moriya, Ibaraki
 Tomisato, Chiba
 Tomigusuku, Okinawa

2006 
 Iwade, Wakayama

2010 
 Miyoshi, Aichi

2011 
 Nonoichi, Ishikawa

References

Cities in Japan